Schinz is a Swiss surname. Notable people with the surname include:

Albert Schinz (1870–1943), Swiss-born U.S. editor and academic
Hans Schinz (1858–1941), Swiss explorer and botanist
Heinrich Rudolf Schinz (1777–1861), Swiss physician and naturalist

Surnames of Swiss origin

Notable Judge 

Walter Schinz the late judge of the circuit court for Milwaukee county born August 14, 1874 died on the day his beloved Milwaukee Braves won the World Series October 9, 1957. He with the help of a group of young lawyers formed a class for the teaching and study of law at night. This informal night school was known as the Milwaukee Law Class and in 1909 was absorbed by Marquette University. He was elected to the circuit bench in 1916 and continued until his retirement in 1954 completing 36 years of continuous service; his then being the longest period of judicial service in the history of Milwaukee county. For more see Volume 7 of the Wisconsin Reports 2d In Memoriam.

This edit was made by Attorney Spiros Stavros Nicolet State Bar of WI #1017488 his great grandson.